The Snowshoe Lava Field is a volcanic field associated with the Mount Edziza volcanic complex in northern British Columbia, Canada. It is on the southern end of the Big Raven Plateau and is an area of young lava flows.

Volcanoes

The volcanoes within the field include:

Cocoa Crater
Coffee Crater
Keda Cone
Sheep Track Pumice
Tennena Cone
The Saucer
Walkout Creek Cone

See also
Desolation Lava Field
List of Northern Cordilleran volcanoes
List of volcanoes in Canada
Mess Lake Lava Field
Northern Cordilleran Volcanic Province
Volcanism of Canada
Volcanism of Western Canada

References

Volcanism of British Columbia
Volcanic fields of Canada
Northern Cordilleran Volcanic Province
Holocene volcanism
Lava fields